The 2018 Summit League women's basketball tournament was a post-season women's basketball tournament for The Summit League. The tournament took place March 3–6, 2018, at the Denny Sanford Premier Center in Sioux Falls, South Dakota. The Top 8 teams in the final standings qualified for the tournament.

Seeds

Schedule

Bracket

See also
 2018 Summit League men's basketball tournament

References

External links
The 2018 Summit League Women's Basketball Championship

Summit League women's basketball tournament
2017–18 Summit League women's basketball season
The Summit League women's basketball tournament